The Men's 400 metre individual medley competition of the 2018 African Swimming Championships was held on 11 September 2018.

Records
Prior to the competition, the existing world and championship records were as follows.

Results

Final
The final was started on 11 September.

References

Men's 400 metre individual medley